Steve Wilson (born May 19, 1954) is a former American football center in the National Football League who played for the Tampa Bay Buccaneers from 1976 to 1985. He was the last original Buccaneer to retire and the only original Buc player to be a starter in each of the first 10 seasons of the franchise. All-NFC Center following the 1979 season, Steve was a member of an offensive line which allowed only 12 quarterback sacks in 16 games during the 1979 season. Following the 1979 season the Buc offensive line was presented with an award in Washington D.C. as "The Best Offensive Line in the NFL." During Wilson's 10-year career, the Bucs were in the playoffs following the 1979, 1981 and 1982 seasons.

Upon Wilson's retirement following the 1985 season, long time NFL player and coach, Bill "Tiger" Johnson said, "Steve is the best pass-blocking center I have ever coached".

References

1954 births
Living people
Sportspeople from Lawton, Oklahoma
American football centers
Georgia Bulldogs football players
Tampa Bay Buccaneers players
People from Fort Sill, Oklahoma
Players of American football from Oklahoma